The De Kimpe azirdine synthesis is a name reaction of organic chemistry, for the generation of aziridines by the reaction of α-chloroimines with nucleophiles such as hydride, cyanide, or Grignard reagents. 

The De Kimpe aziridine synthesis is suitable for both aldimines and ketamines, particularly those with two alkyl substituents on the α-carbon (Thorpe-Ingold effect).

Mechanism
The nucleophile attacks the imino carbon atom, forming a tetrahedral intermediate. The intermediate then undergoes an intramolecular nucleophilic substitution, with the negatively charged nitrogen atom attacking the α-carbon and having the chloride anion as the leaving group.

References

Name reactions